Zang Haili (born December 19, 1978) is a Chinese assistant football coach and a former professional player.

Club career
Zang Haili was born in Changchun, Jilin. He graduated through the youth system of Bayi Football Team and would break into the senior team during the 1997 league season. While he was establishing himself within the team, he saw them relegated at the end of the 1998 league season, however he stayed with the team to aid them in their promotion at the end of the 2000 league season back to the top tier. He continued to be a vital member for Bayi until they disbanded at the end of the 2003 league season. Without a club he would join Liaoning FC where he immediately made himself a regular within their defence for the next several seasons, however at the end of the 2008 league season he was unable to help them fight off relegation. While Zang Haili was tempted to return to his hometown and join Changchun Yatai F.C. he decided to stay with the club and help the team to win the second tier title.

Club career stats

Honours
Liaoning FC
China League One: 2009

References

1978 births
Living people
Footballers from Changchun
Chinese footballers
Chinese football managers
Liaoning F.C. managers
Bayi Football Team players
Liaoning F.C. players
Chinese Super League players
China League One players
Association football defenders